Bambusa australis  is a species of Bambusa bamboo.

Distribution
Bambusa australis is endemic to Vietnam and China.

Description

References

australis
Flora of Vietnam